Ioan Croft is a Welsh amateur boxer who won a bronze medal at the 2022 European Championships. His twin brother, Garan, is also an amateur boxer.

Both twins, who come from Crymych, took up boxing at Cardigan ABC and are Welsh-speaking. They were featured in an S4C television documentary prior to the Commonwealth Games 2022, at which they both represented Wales. At the Games Ioan won a gold medal and Garan bronze.

Ioan fights at welterweight division, his brother Garan at light-middleweight. Their mother insists that they do not fight against one another in a competitive bout.

References

External links 

Living people
Date of birth missing (living people)
Year of birth missing (living people)
Welsh male boxers
Welterweight boxers
Southpaw boxers
Boxers at the 2022 Commonwealth Games
Commonwealth Games gold medallists for Wales
Commonwealth Games medallists in boxing
21st-century Welsh people
Medallists at the 2022 Commonwealth Games